Pierre Clavier (born January 17, 1980 in Lunéville) is a French professional football player. Currently, he plays in the Championnat de France amateur for US Raon-l'Étape.

Career
Clavier began playing football in the youth system of SAS Épinal. He made his professional debut in Ligue 2 at age 16, after the club decided to bring in players from the under-17 team to the senior side.

References

1980 births
Living people
French footballers
Ligue 2 players
SAS Épinal players
FC Mulhouse players
US Raon-l'Étape players
FC Metz players
FC Vesoul players
People from Lunéville
Association football forwards
Sportspeople from Meurthe-et-Moselle
Footballers from Grand Est